This is a list of castles in Canada. Most cannot properly be described as true castles. They are primarily country houses, follies, or other types of buildings built to give the appearance of a castle. They are usually designed in the Gothic Revival, Châteauesque, Renaissance Revival, Romanesque Revival, Scots Baronial or Tudor Revival styles.

See also

 List of castles

Sources
Bart Robinson, "Banff Springs: The story of the hotel", Banff, Summerthought Publishing, 2007, 178 p.
 Communauté Urbaine de Montréal, Répertoire d'architecture traditionnelle sur le territoire de la Communauté Urbaine de Montréal : Les appartements, Service de la planification du territoire (CUM), 1987, 455 p.
 Communauté Urbaine de Montréal, Répertoire d'architecture traditionnelle sur le territoire de la Communauté Urbaine de Montréal : Les édifices publics, Service de la planification du territoire (CUM), 1987, 309 p.
 Communauté Urbaine de Montréal, Répertoire d'architecture traditionnelle sur le territoire de la Communauté Urbaine de Montréal : Les résidences, Service de la planification du territoire (CUM), 1987, 803 p.
"Canadian Landmark Hotel Saves Time and Money with Metasys : Château Frontenac", Milwaukee, Johnson Controls, Inc., 2000, 2 p.
CIty of Gatineau, The assessment roll (retrieved December 1, 2013)
City of Montebello, The assessment roll (retrieved November 28, 2013)
City of Montreal, The assessment roll (retrieved February 6, 2014)
City of Mont-Saint-Hilaire, The assessment roll (retrieved November 28, 2013)
City of Sainte-Marie, The assessment roll (retrieved November 28, 2013)
"Future Options for Casa Loma", Toronto, Casa Loma Corporation, 2012, 115 p., p. 13
Historic Sites and Monuments Board of Canada, Canada's Castles, National Historic Sites of Canada (retrieved October 19, 2013)
 L'école de fouilles archéologique de Pointe-à-Callière, Château de Callière , Pointe-à-Callière (retrieved Octobre 19th, 2013)
Luxury Residence  The Saint George Manor in Mississauga is for sale, Luxury Branded Corporation, October 4, 2021.
Maria Cook, "The heart and soul of a hotel", Ottawa Citizen, June 5, 2012.
McGill University, Square Mile Mansions, Canadian Architecture Collection (retrieved October 19, 2013)
Quebec City, The assessment roll (retrieved November 28, 2013)
Roderick Macleod, "The Road to Terrace Bank: Land Capitalization, Public Space, and the Redpath Family Home, 1837-1861", Erudit, 2003.
Royal Roads University Archives, Hatley Castle Plans (retrieved February 13, 2014)
 Simon Diotte, "La vie de château à Rosemère (Manoir Bleury-Bouthillier)", La Presse, May 25, 2006

Canada
Lists of buildings and structures in Canada
Lists of tourist attractions in Canada
Canada